Sweetwater Creek is a stream in the Texas Panhandle and western Oklahoma. It is a tributary to the North Fork of the Red River.

The stream flows southeast into Wheeler County southwest of Mobeetie and under Texas State Highway 152 and U.S. Route 83 and through the southwest corner Roger Mills County, Oklahoma, and into Beckham County, Oklahoma, southwest of Sweetwater, Oklahoma. The stream turns south and southwest to enter the North Fork of the Red River 2.5 miles from the Oklahoma-Texas line. The confluence is 6.5 miles northwest of Erick, Oklahoma on I-40.

Sweetwater Creek is central to the range of the southern buffalo herd. Along its banks were located favored hunting camps of Plains tribes, such as the Comanche and Kiowa. The encroachment of American hide hunters at Sweetwater Creek was contested by the Comanche and their Kiowa allies. It figured in the Red River War of 1874, which was a campaign by the US Army to confine Native American tribes on the reservations to minimize conflict between the Americans and Native tribes.

Fort Elliott was located on the banks of Sweetwater Creek.

The town of Mobeetie, Texas, a Native American word meaning "sweet water", and Sweetwater, Oklahoma, are named for the creek.

See also
 List of Oklahoma rivers
 List of Texas rivers

References

External links
 Sweetwater Creek @ the Handbook of Texas Online
 

Rivers of Oklahoma
Rivers of Texas
Tributaries of the Red River of the South
Bodies of water of Gray County, Texas
Bodies of water of Wheeler County, Texas
Bodies of water of Roger Mills County, Oklahoma
Bodies of water of Beckham County, Oklahoma